Nadur Youngsters Football Club is a Maltese Football Club from the village of Nadur, on the island of Gozo, Malta.

The club was founded in 1958 and won the Gozo Football League thirteen times and has achieved the Golden Star for sports excellence. The team currently competes in the Gozo Football League First Division. Nadur Youngsters is one of the most popular football teams in Gozo and brings up young players from the village every year.

Achievements
League Champions
Winners (13): 1967/68, 1994/95, 1995/96, 1996/97, 1998/99, 2001/02, 2002/03, 2005/06, 2006/07, 2007/08, 2012/13, 2019/20, 2021/22
Independence Cup
Winners (11): 1967/68, 1989/90, 1993/94, 1994/95, 1995/96, 2001/02, 2004/05, 2005/06, 2006/07, 2007/08, 2012/13
Gozo FA Cup
Winners (9): 1987–1988, 1992–1993, 1993–1994, 1994–1995, 1995–1996, 2003–2004, 2010–11, 2013–14, 2021–22
Super Cup
Winners (8): 1993/94, 1994/95, 1997/98, 2002/03, 2006/07, 2012/13, 2013/14, 2019/20
Freedom Day Cup
Winners (5): 2001/02, 2002/03, 2004/05, 2006/07, 2012/13
Galea Cup
Winners (3): 1961/62, 1963/64, 1964/65
Esso Cup
Winners (2): 1962/63, 1969/70
1st Division K.O 
Winners (2): 2014/15, 2021/22
Republic Cup
Winners (1): 1997/98
Noel Vassallo Cup
Winners (1): 2002/03
Premier Cup
Winners (1): 1996/97
Air Malta Cup
Winners (1): 1995/96
2nd Division League Champions
Winners (1): 1989/90
2nd Division Cup
Winners (1): 1989/90

Club Officials and Coaching staff
 President: Tristen Portelli
 Sponsor: Joseph Portelli
 Secretary: Jean Pierre Saliba
 Tresurer: Derek Borg
 Ass. Seceretary: Edgar Portelli
 Ass. Tresurer: Renald Xuereb
 Ground/Nursery Manager: Joe Portelli
 Ass. Ground/Nursery Manager: Franco Borg
 Kit manager: Joseph Said
 Kit manager: Mario Pace
 PRO: Edgar Portelli
 Accountant: Buttigieg Accounts
 Events: Mario Mercieca
 Events:: Paul Azzopardi
 Events:: Rupert Grech
 Club Chaplain: Dun Karm Portelli
 Club Doctor: Dr. Mario Saliba
 Club Physio: Andrew Cassar
 Coach: Mark Buttigieg
 Ass coach: Paul Camilleri
 Goalkeeper coach: Sammy Attard

Current squad

Recent seasons

Presidential history

References

External links
 Gozo Football Association

Football clubs in Malta
Gozitan football clubs
1958 establishments in Malta
Nadur